Brandywine Village Historic District is a national historic district located along Brandywine Creek at Wilmington, New Castle County, Delaware. It encompasses 12 contributing buildings, 7 contributing sites, and 2 contributing structures. Brandywine Village developed in the late-18th century as a group of flour mills, the homes of prosperous millers, mill workers, shop keepers and artisans. Located in the district are a set of mill owner built homes of granite.  Notable buildings include the Gothic Revival style St. John's Episcopal Church (1857-1858) designed by noted Philadelphia architect John Notman, Brandywine Methodist Episcopal Church (1857), and Brandywine Academy (1798).  In 1788, Brandywine Village was the site of the first mechanized mill designed by Oliver Evans.

It was added to the National Register of Historic Places in 1971 and expanded in 1976.

Education
Residents are zoned to the Red Clay Consolidated School District. It is zoned to Evan G. Shortlidge Academy (Kindergarten-Grade 2), Emalea P. Warner Elementary School (grades 2–5), Skyline Middle School (6-8), and John Dickinson School (9-12).

References

Gothic Revival architecture in Delaware
Historic districts in Wilmington, Delaware
Historic districts on the National Register of Historic Places in Delaware
National Register of Historic Places in Wilmington, Delaware
1788 establishments in the United States